Philosophers (and others important in the history of philosophy), listed alphabetically:

Note: This list has a minimal criterion for inclusion and the relevance to philosophy of some individuals on the list is disputed.

I
 Iamblichus (ca. 245 AD-ca. 325)
 Yahya ibn Adi (893–974)
 Ibn Arabi (1164–1240)
 Ibn ar-Rawandi (827–911)
 Ibn Bajjah (or Avempace) (died 1138)
 Ibn Daud (or Rabad I or Avendauth, or John of Spain) (1110–1180)
 Abraham ibn Ezra (1092/3–1167)
 Moses ibn Ezra (1070–1138)
 Ibn Falaquera (1223–1290)
 Solomon Ibn Gabirol (1021–1058)
 Ibn Hazm (994–1069)
 Ibn Kammuna (1215–1284)
 Ibn Khaldun (1332–1406)
 Ibn Masarra (883–931)
 Ibn Miskawayh (940–1030)
 Bahya ibn Paquda (1040–1110)
 Ibn Sabin (1217–1268)
 Ibn Taymiya (1263–1328)
 Samuel ibn Tibbon (c. 1165 – 1232)
 Ibn Tufail (1110–1185)
 Joseph ibn Tzaddik (c. 1149)
 Ivan Aleksandrovich Il'in (1883–1954)
 Evald Vassilievich Ilyenkov (1924–1979)
 Immanuel the Roman (c. 1270 – c. 1330)
 Roman Ingarden (1893–1970)
 William Ralph Inge (1860–1954)
 José Ingenieros (1877–1925)
 Nae Ionescu (1890–1940)
 Muhammad Iqbal (1877–1938)
 Luce Irigaray (born 1930)
 Terence Irwin (born 1947)
 Isocrates (436–338 BC)
 Isaac of Stella (1105–1177)
 Isaac Israeli (c. 850–950)
 Ito Jinsai (1627–1705)
 Vyacheslav Ivanovich Ivanov (1866–1949)

J
 Jesus of Nazareth (4 BC – AD 30 or 33)
 Frank Jackson (born 1943)
 Friedrich Heinrich Jacobi (1743–1819)
 Franz Jakubowski (1912–1970)
 James of Viterbo (1255–1308)
 Henry James Sr. (1811–1882)
 William James (1842–1910)
 Fredric Jameson (born 1934)
 Vladimir Jankélévitch (1903–1985)
 Karl Jaspers (1883–1969)
 Jayarāśi Bhaṭṭa (fl. c. 800)
 James Hopwood Jeans (1877–1946)
 Thomas Jefferson (1743–1826)
 Richard C. Jeffrey (1926–2002)
 William Stanley Jevons (1835–1882)
 Rudolf von Jhering (1818–1892)
 Jinul (or Chinul) (1158–1210)
 Joachim of Fiore (1135–1201)
 Friedrich Jodl (1849–1914)
 John of Damascus (c. 676–749)
 John of Jandun (1280–1328)
 John of La Rochelle (1190–1245)
 John of Mirecourt (c. 1345)
 John of Paris (1260–1306)
 John of Salisbury (c. 1115–1180)
 John of St. Thomas (or Jean Poinsot) (1589–1644)
 John of the Cross (1542–1591)
 Alexander Bryan Johnson (1786–1867)
 Samuel Johnson (1649–1703)
 Samuel Johnson (1696–1772)
 Samuel Johnson (1709–1784)
 William Ernest Johnson (1858–1931)
 Constance Jones (1848–1922)
 Jørgen Jørgensen (1894–1969)
 Théodore Simon Jouffroy (1796–1842)
 Judah ben Moses of Rome (orJudah Romano) (1292–1330)
 Carl Jung (1875–1961)
 Ernst Jünger (1895–1998)
 Joachim Jungius (1587–1657)
 Justinian I (483–565)
 Al-Juwayni (1028–1085)

K
 Franz Kafka (1883–1924)
 Kaibara Ekiken (1630–1740)
 Kang Youwei (1858–1927)
 Milan Kangrga (1923–2008)
 Immanuel Kant (1724–1804)
 Kao Tzu (c. 420 – 350 BC)
 David Kaplan (born 1933)
 Mordecai Kaplan (1881–1983)
 Nikolai Ivanovich Kareev (1850–1931)
 Lev Platonovich Karsavin (1882–1952)
 Joseph Kaspi (1279–1340) 
 Walter Kaufmann (1921–1980)
 Karl Kautsky (1854–1938)
 Khedrup Gelek Pelzang (1385–1438)
 Konstantin Kavelin (1818–1885)
 Bartholomew Keckermann (1571–1609) 
 Hans Kelsen (1881–1973)
 Norman Kemp Smith (1872–1958)
 Anthony Kenny (born 1931)
 Johannes Kepler (1571–1630)
 John Maynard Keynes (1883–1946)
 Hermann Graf Keyserling (1880–1946)
 Aleksey Khomyakov (1804–1860)
 Søren Kierkegaard (1813–1855)
 Richard Kilvington (1302–1361)
 Robert Kilwardby (1215–1279)
 Jaegwon Kim (1934–2019)
 Al-Kindi (801–873)
 Martin Luther King Jr. (1929–1968)
 Athanasius Kircher (1602–1680) 
 Ivan Kireevsky (1806–1856)
 Patricia Kitcher (born 1948)
 Ludwig Klages (1872–1956)
 Heinrich von Kleist (1777–1811)
 William Calvert Kneale (1906–1990)
 Martin Knutzen (1713–1751)
 Ko Hung (4th century)
 Kurt Koffka (1886–1941)
 Wolfgang Köhler (1887–1967)
 Alexandre Kojève (1902–1968)
 Leszek Kołakowski (1927–2009)
 Alejandro Korn (1860–1936)
 Karl Korsch (1886–1961)
 Karel Kosík (1926–2003)
 Tadeusz Kotarbiński (1886–1981)
 Alexandre Koyre (1892–1964)
 Aleksei Aleksandrovich Kozlov (1831–1901)
 Karl Kraus (1874–1936)
 Karl Christian Friedrich Krause (1781–1832)
 Georg Kreisel (1923–2015)
 Saul Kripke (born 1940)
 Jiddu Krishnamurti (1895–1986)
 Uppaluri Gopala Krishnamurti (1918–2007)
 Julia Kristeva (born 1941)
 Nachman Krochmal (1785–1840)
 Leopold Kronecker (1823–1891)
 Peter Kropotkin (1842–1921)
 Felix Krueger (1874–1948)
 Thomas Samuel Kuhn (1922–1996)
 Kūkai (774–835)
 Kuki Shūzō (1888–1941)
 Oswald Külpe (1862–1915)
 Kumārila Bhaṭṭa (fl. roughly 700)
 Kumazawa Banzan (1619–1691)
 Kuo Hsiang (or Guoxiang) (died c. 312)

L
 Ernst Laas (1837–1885)
 Lucien Laberthonnière (1860–1932)
 Lauren Ross (2009–present)
 Jean de La Bruyère (1645–1696)
 Jacques Lacan (1901–1981)
 Jules Lachelier (1832–1918)
 Ernesto Laclau (1935–2014)
 Philippe Lacoue-Labarthe (1940–2007)
 Pierre Laffitte (1823–1903)
 Louis de La Forge (1632–1666)
 Imre Lakatos (1922–1974)
 André Lalande (1867–1964)
 Jean-Baptiste Lamarck (1744–1829)
 Johann Heinrich Lambert (1728–1777)
 Hughes Felicité Robert de Lamennais (1752–1854)
 Julien Offray de La Mettrie (1709–1751)
 François de La Mothe Le Vayer (1588–1672)
 Ludwig Landgrebe (1902–1992)
 Friedrich Albert Lange (1828–1875)
 Susanne Langer (1895–1985)
 Lao Zi (or Lao Tzu) (4th century BC)
 Isaac La Peyrère (1596–1676)
 Pierre-Simon Laplace (1749–1827)
 Ivan Ivanovich Lapshin (1870–1952)
 François de La Rochefoucauld (1613–1680)
 Pierre Laromiguière (1756–1837)
 Abdullah Laroui (born 1935)
 Ferdinand Lassalle (1825–1864)
 Bruno Latour (born 1947)
 Johann Kaspar Lavater (1741–1801)
 Louis Lavelle (1883–1951)
 Antoine Lavoisier (1743–1794)
 Peter Lavrovitch Lavrov (1823–1900)
 William Law (1686–1761)
 Jean Le Clerc (1657–1737)
 Michèle Le Dœuff (born 1948)
 Henri Lefebvre (1901–1991)
 Jacques Lefèvre d'Étaples (c. 1455–c. 1536)
 Claude Lefort (1924–2010)
 Antoine Le Grand (1629–1699)
 Keith Lehrer (born 1936)
 Gottfried Leibniz (1646–1716)
 Yeshayahu Leibowitz (1903–1994)
 Vladimir Lenin (1870–1924)
 Leonardo da Vinci (1452–1519)
 Konstantin Nikolaevich Leont'ev (1831–1891)
 Aleksei N. Leontiev (1903–1979)
 Giacomo Leopardi (1798–1837)
 Jules Lequier (1814–1862)
 Pierre Leroux (1798–1871)
 Edouard Louis Emmanuel Julien Le Roy (1870–1954)
 René Le Senne (1882–1954)
 Stanisław Leśniewski (1886–1939)
 Gotthold Ephraim Lessing (1729–1781)
 Leucippus (5th century BC)
 Emmanuel Levinas (1906–1995)
 Claude Lévi-Strauss (1908–2009)
 Lucien Lévy-Bruhl (1857–1939)
 Kurt Lewin (1890–1947)
 Clarence Irving Lewis (1883–1964)
 C. S. Lewis (1898–1963)
 David Kellogg Lewis (1941–2001)
 Li Ao (722–841)
 Liang Qichao (or Liang Ch'i-ch'ao) (1873–1929)
 Liang Sou-ming (1893–1988)
 Georg Christoph Lichtenberg (1742–1799)
 Arthur Liebert (1878–1946)
 Otto Liebmann (1840–1912)
 Liezi (or Lieh Tzu) (c. 440 – c. 360& BC)
 Mikhail Lifshitz (1905–1983)
 Linji Yixuan (or Lin Chi) (c. 810 – 867)
 Carl Linnaeus (1707–1778)
 Theodor Lipps (1851–1914)
 Justus Lipsius (1547–1606)
 Émile Littré (1801–1881)
 Liu Shaoqi (orLiu Shao-ch'i) (1898–1969)
 Liu Tsung-chou (or Ch'i-shan) (1578–1645)
 Genevieve Lloyd (born 1941)
 Karl Nickerson Llywelyn (1893–1962)
 Ramon Llull (1235–1315)
 Alain LeRoy Locke (1885–1954)
 John Locke (1632–1704)
 Alfred Loisy (1857–1940)
 Peter Lombard (c. 1100 – 1160)
 Bernard Lonergan (1904–1984)
 Pseudo-Longinus (1st century)
 Leo Mikhailovich Lopatin (1855–1920)
 Paul Lorenzen (1915–1995)
 Aleksei Fedorovich Losev (1893–1988)
 Nicholas Onufrievich Lossky (1870–1965)
 Domenico Losurdo (1941–2018)
 Juri Lotman (1922–1993)
 Hermann Lotze (1817–1881)
 Arthur O. Lovejoy (1873–1962)
 Leo Löwenthal (1900–1993)
 Michael Löwy (born 1938)
 John R. Lucas (1929–2020)
 Lucian (c. 120 – c. 180)
 Lucretius (c. 99 – 55 BC)
 Lu Jiuyuan (or Lu Xiangshan, or Lu Chiu-yuan, or Tzu-ching, or Ts'un-chai) (1139–1193) 
 Georg Lukács (1885–1971)
 Jan Łukasiewicz (1878–1956)
 Anatoliy Lunacharskiy (1875–1933)
 Martin Luther (1483–1546)
 Rosa Luxemburg (1871–1919)
 William Lycan (born 1945)
 Jean-François Lyotard (1924–1998)

M
 Catharine Macaulay (1731–1791)
 Ernst Mach (1838–1916)
 Niccolò Machiavelli (1469–1527)
 Alasdair MacIntyre (born 1929)
 John Leslie Mackie (1917–1981)
 Madhava (died 1386)
 Shri Madhvacharya (1238–1317)
 Mahavira (599–527 BC) 
 Salomon Maimon (or Salomon ben Joshua) (1753–1800)
 Abraham ben Moses Maimonides (or Abraham ben Maimon) (1186–1237)
 Maimonides (or Rambam) (1135–1204)
 Maine de Biran (1766–1824)
 John Major (or John Mair) (1467–1550)
 Errico Malatesta (1853–1932)
 Norman Malcolm (1911–1990)
 Nicolas Malebranche (1638–1715)
 Ernst Mally (1879–1944)
 André Malraux (1901–1976)
 Thomas Malthus (1766–1834)
 Merab Mamardashvili (1930–1990)
 Bernard de Mandeville (1670–1733)
 Mani (3rd century)
 Karl Mannheim (1893–1947)
 Henry Longueville Mansel (1820–1871)
 Mao Zedong (or Mao Tse-tung) (1893–1976)
 Gabriel Marcel (1887–1973)
 Marcion (110–160)
 Ruth Barcan Marcus (1921–2012)
 Herbert Marcuse (1898–1979)
 Joseph Maréchal (1878–1944)
 Juan de Mariana (1536–1624)
 Julián Marías (1914–2005)
 José Carlos Mariátegui (1894–1930)
 Lucrezia Marinella (1571–1653)
 Jacques Maritain (1882–1973)
 Gaius Marius Victorinus (4th century)
 Mihailo Marković (1923–2010)
 Svetozar Marković (1846–1875)
 Odo Marquard (1928–2015)
 Marsilius of Inghen (1330–1396)
 Marsilius of Padua (or Marsiglio or Marsilio dei Mainardine) (1270–1342)
 Roger Marston (1235–1303)
 José Martí (1853–1895)
 Charles B. Martin (1924–2008)
 Harriet Martineau (1802–1876)
 James Martineau (1805–1900)
 Piero Martinetti (1872–1943)
 Anton Marty (1847–1914)
 Marko Marulić (1450–1524)
 Karl Marx (1818–1883)
 Tomáš Masaryk (1850–1937)
 Damaris Cudworth Masham (1659–1708)
 Cotton Mather (1663–1728)
 Matthew of Aquasparta (1238–1302)
 Pierre Louis Maupertuis (1698–1759)
 Fritz Mauthner (1849–1923)
 James Clerk Maxwell (1831–1879)
 Ernst Mayr (1904–2005) 
 James McCosh (1811–1894)
 William McDougall (1871–1938)
 John McDowell (born 1942)
 Evander Bradley McGilvary (1864–1953)
 Colin McGinn (born 1950) 
 John Ellis McTaggart (1866–1925)
 George Herbert Mead (1863–1931)
 Bartolomé de Medina (1527–1580)
 Georg Friedrich Meier (1718–1777)
 Friedrich Meinecke (1862–1954)
 Alexius Meinong (1853–1920)
 Philipp Melanchthon (1497–1560)
 Melissus of Samos (late 5th century BC)
 D. Hugh Mellor (1938–2020)
 Menasseh Ben Israel (1604–1657)
 Mencius (or Meng K'o or Meng-tzu or Mengzi) (372–289 BC)
 Gregor Mendel (1822–1884)
 Moses Mendelssohn (1729–1786)
 Susan Mendus (born 1951)
 Désiré-Joseph Mercier (1851–1926)
 Maurice Merleau-Ponty (1908–1961)
 George merill (1867-1928) 
 Marin Mersenne (1588–1648)
 Jean Meslier (1664–1729)
 Judah Messer Leon (c. 1425 – c. 1495)
 István Mészáros (1930–2017)
 Emile Meyerson (1859–1933)
 Conyers Middleton (1683–1750)
 Mary Midgley (1919–2018)
 Nikolai Konstantinovich Mikhailovskii (1842–1904)
 Miki Kiyoshi (1897–1945)
 Mikyo Dorje (or Mi bskyod rdo rje) (1507–1554)
 Gaston Milhaud (1858–1918)
 James Mill (1773–1836)
 John Stuart Mill (1806–1873)
 John Millar (1735–1801)
 Dickinson Miller (1868–1963)
 Ruth Millikan (born 1933)
 John Milton (1608–1674)
 Minagawa Kien (1734–1807)
 Mir Damad (or Mir Mohammad Baqer Esterabadi) (died 1631)
 Miura Baien (1723–1789)
 Jacob Moleschott (1822–1893)
 Luis de Molina (1535–1600)
 Enrique Molina Garmendia (1871–1962)
 Lord Monboddo (or James Burnett) (1714–1799)
 Richard Montague (1930–1971)
 William Pepperell Montague (1873–1953)
 Michel de Montaigne (1533–1592)
 Baron de Montesquieu (1689–1755)
 Edmund Montgomery (1835–1911)
 G. E. Moore (1873–1958)
 Henry More (1614–1687)
 Thomas More (1478–1535)
 C. Lloyd Morgan (1852–1936)
 Lewis H. Morgan (1818–1881)
 Thomas Morgan (died 1743)
 Karl Philipp Moritz (1756–1793)
 Edgar Morin (born 1921)
 Gaetano Mosca (1858–1941)
 Motoori Norinaga (1730–1801)
 Emmanuel Mounier (1905–1950)
 Mou Tsung-san (1909–1995)
 Mozi (or Mo Tzu, or Mo Ti, or Micius) (c. 470 – c. 390 BC)
 David Ibn Merwan Al-Mukammas (or Daud Ibn Marwan al-Muqammas or David ha-Bavli) (died 937)
 Mulla Sadra (1571–1640)
 Iris Murdoch (1919–1999)
 Muro Kyuso (1658–1734)
 Arthur Edward Murphy (1901–1962)
 Musonius Rufus (1st century)

N
 Arne Næss (1912–2009)
 Nagarjuna (ca. 200 CE)
 Ernest Nagel (1901–1985)
 Thomas Nagel (born 1937)
 Nahmanides (1194–1270)
 Jacques-André Naigeon (1738–1810)
 Toju Nakae (1608–1648)
 Jean-Luc Nancy (1940–2021)
 Hossein Nasr (born 1933)
 Paul Gerhard Natorp (1854–1924)
 Sergey Nechayev (1847–1882)
 Alexander Neckham (1157–1217)
 Antonio Negri (born 1933)
 Leonard Nelson (1882–1927)
 Nemesius of Emesa (fl. c. 400)
 John von Neumann (1903–1957)
 Otto Neurath (1882–1945)
 John Henry Newman (1801–1890)
 Isaac Newton (1642–1727)
 Nichiren (1222–1282)
 Nicholas of Autrecourt (c. 1300 – 1369)
 Nicholas of Cusa (1401–1464)
 Christoph Friedrich Nicolai (1733–1811)
 Pierre Nicole (1625–1695)
 H. Richard Niebuhr (1894–1962)
 Reinhold Niebuhr (1892–1971)
 Friedrich Nietzsche (1844–1900)
 Agostino Nifo (1470–1538)
 Nishi Amane (1829–1897)
 Nishida Kitaro (1870–1945)
 Nishitani Keiji (1900–1990)
 Kwame Nkrumah (1909–1972)
 John Norris (1657–1711)
 Novalis (1772–1801)
 Robert Nozick (1938–2001)
 Numenius of Apamea (2nd century)
 Martha Nussbaum (born 1947)
 Anders Nygren (1890–1978)

O
 Michael Oakeshott (1901–1990)
 William of Ockham (c. 1285–1349)
 Ogyū Sorai (1666–1728)
 Lorenz Oken (1779–1851)
 Karl Olivecrona (1897–1980)
 Peter Olivi (1248–1298)
 Olympiodorus the Younger (495–570)
 John Wood Oman (1860–1939)
 Michel Onfray (born 1959)
 Onora O'Neill (born 1941)
 Nicole Oresme (1320–1382)
 Origen of Alexandria (c. 182–c. 251)
 Isaac Orobio de Castro (1617–1687)
 Hans Christian Ørsted (1777–1851)
 José Ortega y Gasset (1883–1955)
 Wilhelm Ostwald (1853–1932)
 James Oswald (1703–1793)
 Rudolf Otto (1869–1937)
 Richard Overton (died c. 1665)
 Gwilyn Ellis Lane Owen (1922–1982)

P
 Thomas Paine (1737–1809)
 Menyhért Palágyi (1859–1924)
 William Paley (1743–1805)
 Elihu Palmer (1764–1806)
 Panaetius (c. 185 – c. 110 BC)
 Antonie Pannekoek (1873–1960)
 Wolfhart Pannenberg (1928–2014)
 David Papineau (born 1947)
 Giovanni Papini (1881–1956)
 Paracelsus (1493–1541)
 Vilfredo Pareto (1848–1923)
 Derek Parfit (1942–2017)
 Theodore Parker (1810–1860)
 Parmenides (5th century BC)
 Blaise Pascal (1623–1662)
 John Arthur Passmore (1914–2004)
 Valentino Annibale Pastore (1868–1956)
 Patañjali (2nd century BC)
 Walter Pater (1839–1904)
 Jan Patočka (1907–1977)
 Francesco Patrizi da Cherso (or Franciscus Patritius) (1529–1597)
 Akos Pauler (1876–1933)
 Linus Pauling (1901–1994)
 Paul of Venice (1369–1429)
 Friedrich Paulsen (1846–1908)
 Ivan Pavlov (1849–1936)
 Christopher Peacocke (born 1950)
 Giuseppe Peano (1858–1932)
 David Pears (1921–2009)
 Karl Pearson (1857–1936)
 John Peckham (died 1292)
 Benjamin Peirce (1809–1880)
 Charles Sanders Peirce (1839–1914)
 Pelagius (c. 360 – c. 435)
 William Penbygull (died 1420)
 Thomas Percival (1740–1804)
 Ralph Barton Perry (1876–1957)
 Johann Heinrich Pestalozzi (1746–1827)
 Peter of Auvergne (13th century)
 Peter of Spain (13th century; usually identified with Pope John XXI)
 Richard Stanley Peters (1919–2011)
 Jordan B. Peterson (born 1962)
 Petrarch (1304–1374)
 Leon Petrazycki (1867–1931)
 Joane Petrizi (12th century)
 Branislav Petronijević (1875–1954)
 Petar II Petrović-Njegoš (1813–1851)
 Joseph Petzoldt (1862–1929)
 Alexander Pfänder (1870–1941)
 Philip the Chancellor (1160–1236)
 Philo Judaeus of Alexandria (20 BC–40 AD)
 Philo of Larissa (1st century BC)
 Philo the Dialectician (c. 300 BC)
 Philodemus of Gadara (1st century BC)
 Philolaus of Croton (c. 480 – c. 405 BC)
 Philo of Larissa (154 – 84 BC)
 Philo of Megara (300 BC c.)
 John Philoponus (early 6th century)
 Jean Piaget (1896–1980)
 Giovanni Pico della Mirandola (1463–1494)
 Dimitri Pisarev (1840–1868)
 Max Planck (1858–1947)
 Alvin Plantinga (born 1932)
 Plato (c. 427 – c. 347 BC)
 Georgi Plekhanov (1856–1918)
 Helmuth Plessner (1892–1985)
 Gemistus Pletho (c. 1355 – c. 1452)
 Plotinus (died 270)
  (1716–1790)
 Mestrius Plutarch of Chaeronia (c. 45 – c. 120)
 Henri Poincaré (1854–1912)
 Karl Polanyi (1886–1964)
 Michael Polanyi (1891–1976)
 Pietro Pomponazzi (1462–1525)
 Alexander Pope (1688–1744)
 Karl Popper (1902–1994)
 Josef Popper-Lynkeus (1838–1921)
 Porphyry (c. 232 – c. 304)
 Giambattista della Porta (c. 1535–1615)
 Noah Porter (1811–1892)
 Posidonius (c. 135 – 51 BC)
 Richard Posner (born 1939)
 Emil Leon Post (1897–1954)
 Robert Joseph Pothier (1699–1772)
 Nicos Poulantzas (1936–1979)
 François Poullain de la Barre (1647–1723)
 Roscoe Pound (1870–1964)
 Caio Prado Júnior (1907–1990)
 Costanzo Preve (1943–2013)
 Henry Habberley Price (1899–1984)
 Richard Price (1723–1791)
 Harold Arthur Prichard (1871–1947)
 Joseph Priestley (1733–1804)
 Andrew Seth Pringle-Pattison (1856–1931)
 Arthur Prior (1914–1969)
 Proclus (412–487)
 Prodicus (c. 450 – 399 BC)
 Protagoras (c. 481 – 420 BC)
 Pierre-Joseph Proudhon (1809–1865)
 Marcel Proust (1871–1922)
 Pseudo-Dionysius the Areopagite (5th century)
 Pseudo-Grosseteste (13th century)
 Ptolemy (c. 85 – c. 165)
 Samuel Pufendorf (1632–1694)
 Isaac ben Joseph ibn Pulgar (14th century)
 Hilary Putnam (1926–2016)
 Pyrrho (c. 360 – c. 270)
 Pythagoras (582 – 496 BC)

Q
 Antero de Quental (1842–1891)
  (1906–1993)
 W. V. O. Quine (1908–2000)
 Anthony Quinton (1925–2010)

List of philosophers
 (A–C)
 (D–H)
 (I–Q)
 (R–Z)

References